Events from the year 1753 in France

Incumbents
 Monarch – Louis XV

Events
The chemical element bismuth discovered by Claude François Geoffroy

Births
 
4 July –Jean-Pierre Blanchard, inventor, pioneer in balloon flight (died 1809)
25 July – Santiago de Liniers, 1st Count of Buenos Aires, military officer in Spanish colonial service, Viceroy of the Río de la Plata (executed 1810)
20 November – Louis-Alexandre Berthier, maréchal de France (died 1815)
23 November – Guillaume-Mathieu Dumas, military officer (died 1837)
Full date missing
 Pierre Cuillier-Perron, military adventurer (died 1834)
 Charles Julien Fanneau de Lahorie, French sailor (died 1822)

Deaths
18 June – Claude François Geoffroy, chemist (born 1729)
10 November – Bertrand-François Mahé de La Bourdonnais, naval officer (born 1699)
10 December – Claude Gros de Boze, scholar and numismatist (born 1680)

See also

References

1750s in France